The 2016–17 SAFA Second Division (known as the ABC Motsepe League for sponsorship reasons) was the 19th season of the SAFA Second Division, the third tier league for South African association football clubs, since its establishment in 1998. Due to the size of South Africa, the competition is split into nine divisions, one for each region. After the league stage of the regional competition was completed, the nine teams are placed into two 'streams', sometimes referred to as the Inland and Coastal streams.

It was won by Uthongathi, who beat Super Eagles 1-0 in the playoff final. Both teams were promoted to the 2017-18 National First Division.

Results

Eastern Cape

Free State

Gauteng

Limpopo

North-West

Western Cape

References 

SAFA Second Division seasons
2016–17 in South African soccer leagues